Chen Chin-ting (born 26 September 1946) is a Taiwanese politician who served in the Legislative Yuan from 1999 to 2008.

Education
Chen has attended the Army Transportation School, National Chengchi University, and National Chung Hsing University. He completed a bachelor's degree in business administration from Pacific Western University in the United States.

Political career
In his early political career, Chen served as an aid to Li Yuan-tsu. He was first elected to the Legislative Yuan in 1998 and reelected in 2001. Despite his Kuomintang membership, Chen was active in the Alliance for Independent Lawmakers. He was named a member of a new legislative coalition in 2001. However, group leader Lo Fu-chu postponed its formation in July. In June 2002, Chen defied the Kuomintang caucus by submitting his vote on a group of government appointees. For ignoring the Pan-Blue Coalition's attempt to boycott the proceedings, Chen was expelled from the KMT.

In the 2004 legislative elections, Chen ran under the Non-Partisan Solidarity Union, winning a third term. He represented the NPSU in the 2008 elections, but finished second to Chen Hsiu-ching. By 2011, Chen had joined the Democratic Progressive Party and registered for the 2012 legislative elections. He did not win a seat, but the next year he was considered a potential DPP candidate for the Changhua County magistracy, a post eventually won by fellow DPP member Wei Ming-ku. Chen was subsequently named the DPP director for Changhua County.

Political stances
Chen believes the Republic of China and Taiwan to be equivalent entities.

References

1946 births
Living people
Changhua County Members of the Legislative Yuan
Members of the 4th Legislative Yuan
Members of the 5th Legislative Yuan
Members of the 6th Legislative Yuan
Kuomintang Members of the Legislative Yuan in Taiwan
Expelled members of the Kuomintang
Non-Partisan Solidarity Union Members of the Legislative Yuan
Democratic Progressive Party (Taiwan) politicians
National Chung Hsing University alumni
National Chengchi University alumni